Wheelis is a surname. Notable people with the surname include:

Allen Wheelis (1915–2007), American psychoanalyst and writer
Mark Wheelis, American microbiologist